Gabrio Casati (2 August 1798 – 13 November 1873) was an Italian politician, born in Milan.

Political career

During the Five Days of Milan he had a primary role and led the temporary government.

He was prime minister of the Kingdom of Sardinia from 27 July to 15 August 1848, during the provisional annexation of Lombardy to Piedmont.

As Minister of Education, he passed the Casati law, which laid the ground for the unitarian Italy mass education system.

He was twice president of the Senate of Italy (8 November 1865 – 13 February 1867, 21 March 1867 – 2 November 1870).

Death

Casati died at Milan, and was interred in Mausoleo Casati Stampa in Muggiò urban cemetery.

1798 births
1873 deaths
Mayors of Milan
Prime ministers of the Kingdom of Sardinia
Members of the Senate of the Kingdom of Italy
Presidents of the Italian Senate
19th-century Italian politicians